The Cijin Shell Museum is a museum in Cijin District, Kaohsiung, Taiwan.

History
The original Cijin Shell Museum opened on September 11, 2000, on the second floor of the Cijin Seaside Park administration building. After the original museum became too small, the Kaohsiung City Government started building the new museum in 2009, opening it in October 2011.

Architecture
The museum building occupies the top floor of the white, gray-blue and light blue building. The ground floor of the building is the Cijin Seaside Park tourist service center.

Exhibition
The museum houses more than 200 kinds of shrimps and crabs specimens as well as more than 2,000 kinds of shellfish specimens, including three kinds of 'living fossil' Nautilus.

Opening Hours
The museum is open from 9AM to 5PM, from Tuesday to Saturday. The museum is closed on Mondays.

See also
 List of museums in Taiwan

References

External links
 

Museums in Kaohsiung
Seashells in art